The 2015 IHF Men's Junior World Championship was the 20th edition of the tournament and held at Brazil from 19 July to 1 August 2015. The decision to select Brazil as the host was announced 1 August 2014. France won their first title by defeating Denmark 26–24 in the final.

Host cities
The tournament took place entirely in Minas Gerais. Matches will be held in the cities of Uberlândia and Uberaba.

Qualified teams
The Oceania Federation withdrew, Portugal was named the replacement.

Europe

 (Winner qualification group 5)
 (Winner 2013 Men's Youth World Handball Championship)
 (Winner qualification group 2)
 (Winner 2014 European Men's Junior Handball Championship)  (2009 and 2011 Junior World Champions)
 (Winner qualification group 3)
 (Winner qualification group 4)
 (Winner qualification group 6)
 (Winner qualification group 1)
 (Winner qualification group 8)
 (Winner qualification group 7)
 (Runner-Up 2014 European Men's Junior Handball Championship) (2003, 2007 and current 2013 Junior World Champions)
 (Substitution) (Runner-Up qualification group 7)

Africa

 (4th 2014 African Men's Junior Handball Championship)
 (3rd 2014 African Men's Junior Handball Championship)
 (Winner 2014 African Men's Junior Handball Championship)
 (Runner-Up 2014 African Men's Junior Handball Championship)

Asia

Americas

 (Runner-Up 2015 Pan American Men's Junior Handball Championship)
 (Host) (Winner 2015 Pan American Men's Junior Handball Championship)
 (3rd 2015 Pan American Men's Junior Handball Championship)
  (additional 4th place as Brazil is host of tournament) (5th 2015 Pan American Men's Junior Handball Championship))
 (4th 2015 Pan American Men's Junior Handball Championship)

Preliminary round
The draw was held on 21 May 2015.

All times are local (UTC−3).

Group A

Group B

Group C

Group D

Knockout stage

5th place bracket

Round of 16

Quarterfinals

5th–8th place semifinals

Semifinals

Seventh place game

Fifth place game

Third place game

Final

9–16th placement games
The eight losers of the round of 16 were seeded according to their results in the preliminary round against teams ranked 1–4.

Ranking

15th place game

13th place game

Eleventh place game

Ninth place game

President's Cup
17th place bracket

21st place bracket

21st–24th place semifinals

17th–20th place semifinals

23rd place game

21st place game

19th place game

17th place game

Final standings

Awards

MVP
Right-back:

All-star team
Goalkeeper: 
Right wing: 
Right back: 
Centre back: 
Left back: 
Left wing: 
Pivot:

References

External links
Official website
IHF Site

2015 Junior
Men's Junior World Handball Championship
Junior World Handball Championship
2015 in Brazilian sport
July 2015 sports events in South America
August 2015 sports events in South America